Klatt is a surname. Notable people with the surname include:
Bernard Klatt, former Canadian internet service provider
Bill Klatt (ice hockey) (1947–2011), retired professional ice hockey player
Dennis H. Klatt, (1938–1988), American researcher in speech and hearing science
Dusty Klatt, professional motocross racer from Campbell River, British Columbia, Canada
Friedrich Wilhelm Klatt (1825–1897), German botanist who specialised in the study of African plants
Joel Klatt (born 1982), currently a talk radio personality on 102
Marcin Klatt (born 1985), Polish footballer who plays for Pogoń Szczecin
Paul Klatt (1896–1973), German general who commanded the 3. Gebirgs-Division
Trent Klatt (born 1971), retired American professional ice hockey right winger
Werner Klatt (born 1948), German rower who competed for East Germany in the 1976 Summer Olympics

See also
 Klaatu, a character in the 1951 film The Day the Earth Stood Still